This is a list of episodes from the first season of The Many Loves of Dobie Gillis. This season of the series explores Dobie Gillis' life as a junior at Central High School, and is the only season of the series to feature Tuesday Weld and Warren Beatty among the cast.

Broadcast history
The season originally aired Tuesdays at 8:30-9:00 pm (EST) on CBS from September 29, 1959 to July 5, 1960.

Nielsen ratings
The season was not ranked in the Top 30 shows.

DVD release
The Region 1 DVD of the entire series was released on July 2, 2013. A Season One standalone set was released on September 10 of that year.

Cast

Main
 Dwayne Hickman as Dobie Gillis
 Frank Faylen as Herbert T. Gillis (32 episodes)
 Florida Friebus as Winifred "Winnie" Gillis (32 episodes)
 Bob Denver as Maynard G. Krebs (34 episodes)
 Michael J. Pollard as Jerome Krebs (2 episodes)

Recurring

Episodes

References

External links
 

1959 American television seasons
1960 American television seasons
1